The following is a list of topics named after Évariste Galois (1811–1832), a French mathematician.

Mathematics
Galois closure
Galois cohomology
Galois connection
Galois correspondence
Galois/Counter Mode
Galois covering
Galois deformation
Galois descent
Galois extension
Galois field
Galois geometry
Galois group
Absolute Galois group
Galois LFSRs
Galois module
Galois representation
Galois ring
Galois theory
Differential Galois theory
Topological Galois theory
Inverse Galois problem

Other
Galois (crater)

Galois